Epitrix tuberis, the tuber flea beetle, is a species of flea beetle in the family Chrysomelidae. It is found in North America.

References

 Riley, Edward G., Shawn M. Clark, and Terry N. Seeno (2003). "Catalog of the leaf beetles of America north of Mexico (Coleoptera: Megalopodidae, Orsodacnidae and Chrysomelidae, excluding Bruchinae)". Coleopterists Society Special Publication no. 1, 290.

Further reading

 Arnett, R. H. Jr., M. C. Thomas, P. E. Skelley and J. H. Frank. (eds.). (21 June 2002). American Beetles, Volume II: Polyphaga: Scarabaeoidea through Curculionoidea. CRC Press LLC, Boca Raton, Florida .
 Arnett, Ross H. (2000). American Insects: A Handbook of the Insects of America North of Mexico. CRC Press.
 Richard E. White. (1983). Peterson Field Guides: Beetles. Houghton Mifflin Company.

Alticini
Agricultural pest insects
Beetles described in 1944